The 1906–07 City Cup was the thirteenth edition of the City Cup, a cup competition in Irish football.

The tournament was won by Belfast Celtic for the second time and second consecutive year.

Group standings

References

1906–07 in Irish association football